Deki Lhazom is a Bhutanese footballer who plays as a forward for Saudi Women's Premier League club Al-Ittihad and the Bhutan women's national football team. She is the joint highest goal scorer of Bhutan's senior national team with 3 goals.

Club career
Lhazom began playing football at age eight. She was noticed by a district coach while playing for her school club. She was then invited to the 2017 Milo Cup before entering into the women's academy in Gelephu. 

After impressing in senior international friendlies against Saudi Arabia, she was offered a contract with Al-Ittihad of the Saudi Women's Premier League. By joining the club, she became the first female Bhutanese player in history to play abroad. The Bhutan Football Federation reported that it was initially a one-year contract worth $3000 USD or about Nu. 240,000 per month.

International career
Lhazom made her international debut at the 2017 SAFF U-15 Women's Championship. She went on to appear in every SAFF youth tournament through 2022. She scored against Nepal at the 2019 edition of the tournament. The goal helped Nepal secure its only point in the competition, ultimately failing to advance to the knockout rounds.

In December 2019 Lhazom was part of the under-15 national team that competed in a pair of friendlies away to Nepal. Lhazom scored her nation's only goal in the opening 1–6 defeat.

Lhazom made her senior international debut on 6 September 2022 against Nepal in the 2022 SAFF Women's Championship. Her first two senior international goals came against Sri Lanka on 10 September 2022 in the same competition. The match ended in a 5–0 victory. The result set several records for the team, including largest margin of victory and first win, multi-goal victory, and shutout in the tournament.

In September 2022 she scored a goal and impressed in a set of international friendlies away to Saudi Arabia.

Career statistics

International

International goals

Senior
Scores and results list Bhutan's goal tally first.

Youth
Scores and results list Bhutan's goal tally first.

References

External links

Living people
Bhutanese women's footballers
Bhutan women's international footballers
Women's association football forwards
Year of birth missing (living people)
Saudi Women's Premier League players